Birendra Kumar Chaudhary is an Indian politician, a member of parliament from Jhanjharpur (Lok Sabha constituency). He was elected in the 2014 Indian general election as a Bharatiya Janata Party candidate.

References

India MPs 2014–2019
Living people
Lok Sabha members from Bihar
People from Madhubani district
1953 births
Bharatiya Janata Party politicians from Bihar